Müjdat Yetkiner (born 16 November 1961), known as Miço by supporters, is a former professional footballer who played as a defender or midfielder. He is the most capped Turkish player in the history of Fenerbahçe with 763 caps. He played the positions of sweeper, defender, fullback, defensive midfielder, midfielder, winger and attacking midfielder. He also played as a forward several times. As a player, he was a favourite with fans.

Career
Born in İstanbul, Yetkiner played for Fenerbahçe between 1980 and 1995, being capped 429 times in Turkish League history, scored 23 goals and winning the Turkish League title three times (1982–83, 1983–84 and 1988–89). He was shown 44 yellow and 5 red cards. He was called up to play for the Turkey national team 26 times at the professional level, 10 times for Turkey U21 and six times for Turkey U18. He continued his career as the manager of Fenerbahçe's youth team after he retired from football in 1995.

Honours
 Turkish Football League: 1982–83, 1984–85, 1988–89
 Turkish Cup: 1982–83
 Presidents Cup: 1984, 1985, 1990
 Chancellor Cup: 1988–89, 1992–93
 TSYD Cup:1980–81, 1982–83, 1985–86, 1986–87, 1994–95
 Fleet Cup: 1982, 1983, 1984, 1985

References

1961 births
Living people
Turkish footballers
Footballers from Istanbul
Association football midfielders
Association football defenders
Turkey international footballers
Turkey youth international footballers
Fenerbahçe S.K. footballers